KRWQ (100.3 FM) is a radio station broadcasting a country music format. Licensed to Gold Hill, Oregon, United States, the station serves the Medford-Ashland area.  The station is currently owned by Bicoastal Media Licenses Vi, LLC.  The station features longtime market veteran Bryce Burtner - mornings, Angie Foster - Mid days, and Big Scott in the afternoon.  Nights with Elaina, and Later With Lia round out the after hours lineup on Q100.3.

Current Logo

Translators
KRWQ broadcasts on the following translators:

Previous logo
 (KRWQ's Current Logo)

(KRWQ's logo under previous branding)

References

External links
Official Website

Country radio stations in the United States
1980 establishments in Oregon
RWQ